Kenneth Nils Harring (born February 10, 1967) is an American college baseball coach who has been the head coach of UMass Lowell since the start of the 2004 season.

Playing career 
Harring was a four-year player at NCAA Division II Le Moyne College where he helped the Dolphins to NCAA Tournament bids in 1986, 1987 and 1989.

Among Le Moyne's Division I leaders, Harring ranks second in batting (.367), third in slugging percentage (.609) and 21st in hits (108). He led the Dolphins in runs, hits and doubles in his junior and senior years. He was inducted into Le Moyne's Gold Wave Hall of Fame in 2003, Harring helped the Dolphins to a collective record of 54-18-1 in his junior and senior seasons (.740), Le Moyne's first years as a Division I program.

After graduating from Le Moyne with a degree in business administration, Harring spent two years in the Atlanta Braves organization with the Durham Bulls of the Carolina League where his manager was former Boston Red Sox's manager Grady Little.

Coaching career

Northeastern 
Harring accepted his first coaching position at Northeastern University, where he remained from 1996–1999. During his stay, the Huskies posted a collective 105–88 record and captured the 1997 America East Conference Tournament. That year, the Huskies advanced to the NCAA Tournament where it defeated Bethune–Cookman, before falling to Stanford and Cal State–Fullerton in the West Regional. While at Northeastern in 1999, Harring served as an assistant coach of the Cotuit Kettleers of the Cape Cod Baseball League.

Saint Anselm 
In 2000, Harring was named the head coach at Saint Anselm College. Shortly after his appointment to Saint Anselm, Harring served as the manager of the Keene Swamp Bats, leading them to the 2000 New England Collegiate Baseball League (NECBL) championship.

Harring's teams at Saint Anselm significantly improved with each season, culminating with the record-breaking season in 2004. After struggling to a 9–35 finish in 2001, Harring guided the Hawks to a 17–32 clip in 2002, which included a 15–17 showing in the NE-10 (fourth place in the six-team Pepin Division).

The 2003 Saint Anselm squad posted a record of 23–20 (its first winning season in 23 years) and captured the Eastern College Athletic Conference (ECAC) Division II championship. Along the way, the Hawks finished third in the NE-10 Pepin Division and garnered their first appearance in the NE-10 Tournament.

The 2004 Northeast-10 Conference Coach of the Year, Harring guided Saint Anselm to its best season in school history with a 30–22 overall record (24-8 NE-10). He led the Hawks to the 2004 NE-10 regular season championship as well as its first NCAA Tournament bid in school history. Under his guidance, the Hawks posted a record of 79–109 including a NE-10 conference record of 63–59.

UMass Lowell 

Harring and UMass Lowell saw continued success in 2015, finishing third in the America East with a 17–26 overall record and a 10–10 record in conference. Four River Hawks earned America East All-Conference honors including shortstop Danny Mendick who was drafted in the 22nd round by the Chicago White Sox, becoming the third player to be drafted under Harring's tenure.

The UMass Lowell baseball team transitioned to Division I with little problems in 2014, finishing third in their new conference, the America East, with an overall record of 20–22 and a 10–10 in-conference.

UMass Lowell enjoyed a great deal of success in 2011, going 37–14 and clinching the fourth NCAA Tournament bid of Harring's tenure. While there, the River Hawks eliminated Dowling in the East Regional.

Harring steered the 2009 squad to a 25–21 record and the Northeast-10 Conference Tournament semifinals. Under his watch, six River Hawks were named to the NE-10 All-Star Team and Jack Leathersich claimed the NE-10 Freshman Pitcher of the Year honor.

With 18 freshmen and sophomores on its 2008 roster, UMass Lowell compiled a 26–24 record and advanced to the Northeast-10 Conference Tournament. Over the season, Harring earned his 100th victory at UMass Lowell and the 200th of his career.

The 2007 season saw the River Hawks go 33–20, marking the second straight year and ninth time in school history UML has eclipsed the 30-victory plateau.

In 2006, the River Hawks (37–14) posted the second-highest win total in school history and captured their fifth Northeast-10 Conference Tournament championship in six years. UML also earned its second straight and eighth NCAA Tournament appearance in the last nine years.

In his first season at UML, Harring led the River Hawks to a 28–20 record, up from a 22–21 clip in 2004. UML returned to the NCAA tournament as the No. 4 seed in the region, where it defeated No. 1 Franklin Pierce (8–2) before losing to No. 2 Southern Connecticut (10–3) and the Ravens (16–11).

In Harring's first three seasons, the River Hawks have had eight players named to the ABCA/Rawlings All-Northeast Region teams and 26 players named to the NE-10 All-Conference teams.

Personal life 
Harring and his wife, Shauna, live in Amesbury, Massachusetts, with their daughter Mikaela and son Jacob.

Head coaching record

See also 
 List of current NCAA Division I baseball coaches
 UMass Lowell River Hawks

References

External links 

Living people
Sportspeople from Troy, New York
1960 births
Baseball players from New York (state)
Le Moyne Dolphins baseball players
UMass Lowell River Hawks baseball coaches
Baseball coaches from New York (state)
Idaho Falls Braves players
Durham Bulls players
Northeastern Huskies baseball coaches
Cape Cod Baseball League coaches
Saint Anselm Hawks baseball coaches